is a former Japanese football player.

Playing career
Nishimoto was born in Iwakuni on April 29, 1980. After graduating from high school, he joined J1 League club Bellmare Hiratsuka (later Shonan Bellmare) in 1999. On August 7, he debuted against Nagoya Grampus Eight and scored 2 goals in this match. However the club results were bad and was relegated to J2 League from 2000. His opportunity to play also decreased due to injury from 2000 and he retired end of 2002 season.

Club statistics

References

External links

1980 births
Living people
People from Iwakuni, Yamaguchi
Association football people from Yamaguchi Prefecture
Japanese footballers
J1 League players
J2 League players
Shonan Bellmare players
Association football forwards